The 2022 Baseball5 Asia Cup was the first edition of the Baseball5 Asia Cup, a Baseball5 tournament organized by WBSC Asia. The championship was held from 16 to 19 August 2022, in Kuala Lumpur, Malaysia and was contested between nine national teams.

Chinese Taipei won the tournament, beating Japan in the final 2 matches to 1. South Korea finished third defeating Hong Kong 2 matches to 0 in the Bronze medal game.

Opening round

Group A

Group B

Group C

Super round

Placement round

Playoffs

Final standings

References

2022
Baseball5 Asia Cup
Baseball5 Asia Cup
Sports competitions in Kuala Lumpur
International sports competitions hosted by Malaysia
Baseball5